Dai Dinh may refer to:

Đại Định (1140–1162), era name used by Lý Anh Tông
Đại Định (1369–1370), era name used by Dương Nhật Lễ
Đại Đình, a commune-level town in Tam Đảo district, Vĩnh Phúc, Vietnam